Alavala is a village in Palnadu district of the Indian state of Andhra Pradesh. It is located in Rompicherla mandal of Narasaraopet revenue division.

Government and politics 

Alavala gram panchayat is the local self-government of the village. It is divided into wards and each ward is represented by a ward member. The ward members are headed by a Sarpanch.

References 

Villages in Guntur district